Bamazomus is a genus of hubbardiid short-tailed whipscorpions, first described by Mark Harvey in 1992.

Species 
, the World Schizomida Catalog accepts the following eleven species:

 Bamazomus aviculus Harvey, 2001 – Seychelles
 Bamazomus bamaga Harvey, 1992 – Australia (Queensland)
 Bamazomus hunti Harvey, 2001 – Australia (Western Australia)
 Bamazomus madagassus (Lawrence, 1969) – Madagascar
 Bamazomus milloti (Lawrence, 1969) – Madagascar
 Bamazomus pileti (Brignoli, 1974) – Malaysia (mainland)
 Bamazomus siamensis (Hansen, 1905) – Hong Kong, Japan, Thailand, Hawaii
 Bamazomus subsolanus Harvey, 2001 – Australia (Western Australia)
 Bamazomus vadoni (Lawrence, 1969) – Madagascar
 Bamazomus vespertinus Harvey, 2001 – Australia (Western Australia)
 Bamazomus weipa (Harvey, 1992) – Australia (Queensland)

References 

Schizomida genera